Myron N. Dobashi (born August 1, 1943) is a retired brigadier general in the National Guard of the United States and former commander of the Hawaii Air National Guard.

Career
Dobashi joined the United States Air Force in 1965 and was stationed at Truax Air Force Base in Madison, Wisconsin, until 1967. From there he was deployed overseas to serve in the Vietnam War. He later joined the Hawaii Air National Guard in 1969. From 1996 to 1999 he held command of the 201st Combat Communications Group before being promoted to commander of the Hawaii Air National Guard from 1999 to 2003.

Awards he received include the Legion of Merit with oak leaf cluster, the Bronze Star Medal, the Meritorious Service Medal with oak leaf cluster, the Air Force Commendation Medal with oak leaf cluster, the Outstanding Unit Award with valor device and silver and bronze oak leaf cluster, the Combat Readiness Medal with silver oak leaf cluster and bronze oak leaf cluster, the National Defense Service Medal with oak leaf cluster, the Vietnam Service Medal with service star, the Humanitarian Service Medal, the Air Force Overseas Service Ribbon - Short Tour, the Air Force Longevity Service Award with silver oak leaf cluster and two bronze oak leaf clusters, the Small Arms Expert Marksmanship Ribbon, the Air Force Training Ribbon, the Vietnam Gallantry Cross, and the Vietnam Campaign Medal.

Education
B.A. – history, Central Washington State College

References

1943 births
Living people
United States Air Force generals
Recipients of the Legion of Merit
Recipients of the Gallantry Cross (Vietnam)
United States Air Force personnel of the Vietnam War
Central Washington University alumni
Hawaii National Guard personnel